Autonomous District Lok Sabha constituency is one of the 14 Lok Sabha constituencies in the Indian state of Assam. The constituency consists of three autonomous districts namely Dima Hasao, Karbi Anglong and West Karbi Anglong district.

The constituency seat is reserved for Scheduled Tribes.

Vidhan Sabha cum Assembly segments
Autonomous District Lok Sabha constituency is composed of the following assembly segments:

Members of Parliament

Election results

General election 2019

General election 2014

General election 2009

General elections 2004

See also
 Dima Hasao district
 Karbi Anglong district
 West Karbi Anglong district
 List of Constituencies of the Lok Sabha

References

External links
Autonomous District lok sabha  constituency election 2019 date and schedule

Lok Sabha constituencies in Assam
Karbi Anglong district